Kostomlátky is a municipality and village in Nymburk District in the Central Bohemian Region of the Czech Republic. It has about 300 inhabitants.

Administrative parts
The village of Doubrava is an administrative part of Kostomlátky.

Gallery

References

Villages in Nymburk District